Carex dioica, the dioecious sedge (a name it shares with Carex sterilis), is a species of flowering plant in the genus Carex, native to Iceland, the Faroes, Svalbard, nearly all of Europe, western Siberia, and the Altai. It prefers to live in calcareous fens.

References

dioica
Taxa named by Carl Linnaeus
Plants described in 1753
Dioecious plants